is a Japanese footballer who plays for Nagoya Grampus.

International career
He made his debut for Japan national football team on 30 March 2021 in a World Cup qualifier against Mongolia and scored twice in the 14–0 victory.

International goals

Club statistics
Updated to 24 February 2022.

Honours
Nagoya Grampus
J.League Cup: 2021

Individual
J.League Best XI: 2021
J.League Cup Most Valuable Player: 2021

References

External links
Profile at Sanfrecce Hiroshima 
Profile at Ventforet Kofu

1991 births
Living people
Nippon Sport Science University alumni
Association football people from Tokyo
Japanese footballers
Japan international footballers
J1 League players
Ventforet Kofu players
Sanfrecce Hiroshima players
Nagoya Grampus players
Association football midfielders